Lee Ju-seung (born 13 December 1990 in Seoul) is a South Korean sledge hockey player. He was a member of South Korea's bronze medal winning team in para ice hockey at the 2018 Winter Paralympics.

He was born with myelitis.

References

External links 
 

1990 births
Living people
South Korean sledge hockey players
Paralympic sledge hockey players of South Korea
Paralympic bronze medalists for South Korea
Ice sledge hockey players at the 2014 Winter Paralympics
Para ice hockey players at the 2018 Winter Paralympics
Medalists at the 2018 Winter Paralympics
Sportspeople from Seoul
Sportspeople with cerebral palsy
Chungbuk National University alumni
Paralympic medalists in sledge hockey